Animation is a triannual peer-reviewed academic journal that covers the field of film and media studies, focusing on animations implications for other forms of media. The editor-in-chief is Suzanne Buchan (Royal College of Art). It was established in 2006 and is currently published by SAGE Publications.

Abstracting and indexing 
Animation is abstracted and indexed in:
 Academics Premier
 Arts and Humanities Citation Index
 British Humanities Index
 Current Contents/Arts & Humanities
 Educational Research Abstracts Online
 Scopus

External links 
 

SAGE Publishing academic journals
English-language journals
Media studies journals
Publications established in 2006
Triannual journals